Fuad Muzurović (born 3 November 1945) is a Bosnian retired professional football manager and former player.

Playing career
Although he did not have an international playing career, Muzurović is still remembered as a quality full-back playing for his hometown club Jedinstvo Bijelo Polje and Sarajevo, where he won the Yugoslav First League in the 1966–67 season.

Managerial career
Muzurović's managerial skills led him to various countries with good success, although he did not manage to win many trophies. He managed Sarajevo in three periods, with the first one from 1977 to 1981 in Yugoslav First League, achieving a runner-up place in 1980. After that Muzurović was the manager of Prishtina from 1983 to 1984, managing to drive the small newcomer side to the best position in their history when they finished 8th in the Yugoslav First League in the 1983–84 season. He was once again Prishtina's manager from 1985 to 1986. The next appointment was at Turkish club Adana Demirspor in 1987, staying there for one year. His second appointment as Sarajevo manager came in the 1990–91 season. After the Bosnian War, Muzurović was the first head coach of the newly founded Bosnia and Herzegovina national team, managing to clinch a historical victory against Denmark in a 3–0 thriller in Sarajevo. Failing to qualify for the 1998 FIFA World Cup, he was replaced with Džemaludin Mušović in 1998.

Muzurović then had a two-month spell as Adanaspor manager in the 1998–99 season, from where he went to Qatar's Al Arabi in 1999. The third and final appointment as Sarajevo's manager came in the 2001–02 season, managing to win his first and only managerial career, the Bosnian Cup. Muzurović was then manager of Egyptian Premier League club Al Masry in July 2002, leaving the club shortly after in December of that year. On 1 February 2004, the Japanese J1 League club Cerezo Osaka board appointed him as their manager, but was sacked after leading the club in only two games, the second fastest sacking of a manager in J1 League history.

On 21 December 2006, Muzurović became the new head coach of the Bosnia and Herzegovina national team for a second time in his career, nearly three years after getting sacked at Cerezo Osaka. One of the most memorable wins of Bosnia and Herzegovina came during Muzurović's coaching, particularly a 3–2 home win against Turkey in the UEFA Euro 2008 qualifiers on 2 June 2007, a game which also saw the international debut of Edin Džeko. He stayed as head coach until 17 December 2007.

Managerial statistics

Honours

Player
Sarajevo
Yugoslav First League: 1966–67

Manager
Sarajevo
Bosnian Cup: 2001–02

References

External links

1945 births
Living people
People from Bijelo Polje
Bosniaks of Montenegro
Association football defenders
Yugoslav footballers
FK Sarajevo players
FK Jedinstvo Bijelo Polje players
Yugoslav First League players
Yugoslav football managers
FK Sarajevo managers
FC Prishtina managers
Adana Demirspor managers
Bosnia and Herzegovina football managers
Bosnia and Herzegovina national football team managers
Adanaspor managers
Al-Arabi SC (Qatar) managers
Al Masry SC managers
Cerezo Osaka managers
Yugoslav First League managers
Süper Lig managers
Qatar Stars League managers
Premier League of Bosnia and Herzegovina managers
Egyptian Premier League managers
J1 League managers
Yugoslav expatriate football managers
Expatriate football managers in Turkey
Yugoslav expatriate sportspeople in Turkey
Bosnia and Herzegovina expatriate football managers
Bosnia and Herzegovina expatriate sportspeople in Turkey
Expatriate football managers in Qatar
Bosnia and Herzegovina expatriate sportspeople in Qatar
Expatriate football managers in Egypt
Expatriate football managers in Japan
Bosnia and Herzegovina expatriate sportspeople in Japan
Bosnia and Herzegovina expatriate sportspeople in Egypt